Ajubus is a genus of leaf beetles in the subfamily Eumolpinae. It contains only one species, Ajubus viridis, described from Champion Bay in Western Australia. The genus was originally named Thaumastomerus by Hamlet Clark in 1865; however, this name was preoccupied by Thaumastomerus Wollaston, 1861 (a beetle genus in Curculionidae), so it was renamed to Ajubus by N. A. Aslam in 1968.

References

External links
 Genus Ajubus Aslam, 1968 at Australian Faunal Directory

Eumolpinae
Monotypic Chrysomelidae genera
Beetles of Australia